Cartan may refer to: 
 Élie Cartan (1869–1951), French mathematician who worked with Lie groups
 Henri Cartan (1904-2008), French mathematician who worked in algebraic topology, son of Élie Cartan
Anna Cartan (1878-1923), French mathematician and teacher, sister of Élie Cartan
 Cartan (crater), a lunar crater named for Élie Cartan
 Badea Cârțan (1849-1911), Austro-Hungarian Romanian activist